Apple Tree House is a television drama series produced by CBeebies for children under age 2 to 6 It is set on the fictitious Apple Tree House estate in London, and filmed in Bromley-by-Bow. it was produced by Five Apples Ltd for the BBC. Apple Tree House is also available on BBC iPlayer for over a year.

History
The series was originally proposed as an animation series by Rastamouse producers Eugenio Perez and Gregory Boardman. The live action series was created by William Vanderpuye, Maria Timotheou and Akindele Akinsiku, drawing on their own childhood experiences. The CBeebies commissioner said of the show that "The urban setting is important for a lot of children. When you’re a child you do read stories and they are a bit idealistic - this will be more real and more authentic."

The first of 30 episodes was first broadcast on 22 May 2017, and a second series was commissioned that year.

Cast
Principal characters
Kobi The Caretaker, played by William Vanderpuye
Mali, played by Aamir Tai
Sam, played by Miranda Sarfo Peprah
Bella, played by Summer Jenkins
David, played by Eden Gough
Laila, played by Sahana Rameswaren-Kangesan
Zainab, played by Shaheen Khan
Patience, played by Andrea Hall
Flo, played by Alison Lintott
Katie, Played by Rachael Hart

References

External links
 BBC Media Centre

2017 British television series debuts
2010s British children's television series
British preschool education television series
CBeebies